Jean Spurney Inness (December 18, 1900 – December 27, 1978) was an American film, stage and television actress. She was known for playing Nurse Beatrice Fain in the American medical drama television series Dr. Kildare.

Life and career 
Inness was born in Cleveland, Ohio. She attended Bryn Mawr College, and the American Academy of Dramatic Arts. Inness began her career in 1920 touring Indianapolis and Cincinnati with the Stuart Walker Stock Company. She also starred with Stewart Walker in productions of The Cradle Snatchers and An Ideal Husband.

Inness performed for 34 weeks with the Denham Stock Company in Denver, Colorado, and for 26 weeks in Pittsburgh, Pennsylvania. She performed at the Actors Theatre of Louisville in Louisville, Kentucky, with leading roles in stage plays including Cat On a Hot Tin Roof, Long Day's Journey Into Night, Stages and Death of a Salesman. Her son was a stage director at the Actors Theatre of Louisville. In 1928, Inness was cast in the lead role of the stage play The Jest at the Pasadena Playhouse.

Inness played the title role in the 1940 production of Ramona, starring with Onslow Stevens.

Inness began her screen career in 1942, appearing in the film Not a Ladies' Man. She appeared on television programs including Gunsmoke, The Andy Griffith Show, Bonanza, The Twilight Zone, Wagon Train, The Virginian, The Big Valley and Rawhide. Inness played Nurse Beatrice Fain in the medical drama television series Dr. Kildare.

Death 
Inness died in December 1978 at her home in Santa Monica, California, at the age of 78.

References

External links 

Rotten Tomatoes profile

1900 births
1978 deaths
People from Cleveland
Actresses from Ohio
American film actresses
American television actresses
American stage actresses
20th-century American actresses
Bryn Mawr College alumni